Cearense may refer to:
 The demonym of Ceará, Brazil
Dudu Cearense Brazilian footballer from Ceará
 Associação de Basquete Cearense, a basketball club based in Fortaleza
Campeonato Cearense, Ceará state football top division
Cearense dialect, Portuguese spoken in Ceará

Language and nationality disambiguation pages